Nirripirti is a genus of beetles in the family Dytiscidae.  However the Australian Faunal Directory considers it a synonym of the genus, Paroster, on the basis of work by Leys and Watts, and Toussaint, Hendrich and others.

It contains the following species:

 Nirripirti arachnoides Watts & Humphreys, 2004
 Nirripirti bulbus Watts & Humphreys, 2004
 Nirripirti byroensis Watts & Humphreys, 2004
 Nirripirti copidotibiae Watts & Humphreys, 2004
 Nirripirti darlotensis Watts & Humphreys, 2003
 Nirripirti dingbatensis Watts & Humphreys, 2004
 Nirripirti eurypleuron Watts & Humphreys, 2004
 Nirripirti fortisspina Watts & Humphreys, 2003
 Nirripirti hamoni Watts & Humphreys, 2003
 Nirripirti hinzeae Watts & Humphreys, 2001
 Nirripirti innouendyensis Watts & Humphreys, 2004
 Nirripirti killaraensis Watts & Humphreys, 2003
 Nirripirti macrocephalus Watts & Humphreys, 2003
 Nirripirti macrosturtensis Watts & Humphreys, 2006
 Nirripirti megamacrocephalus Watts & Humphreys, 2006
 Nirripirti melroseensis Watts & Humphreys, 2003
 Nirripirti mesosturtensis Watts & Humphreys, 2006
 Nirripirti microsturtensis Watts & Humphreys, 2006
 Nirripirti milgunensis Watts & Humphreys, 2003
 Nirripirti napperbyensis Watts & Humphreys, 2003
 Nirripirti newhavenensis Watts & Humphreys, 2003
 Nirripirti pentameres Watts & Humphreys, 2003
 Nirripirti plutonicensis Watts & Humphreys, 2003
 Nirripirti septum Watts & Humphreys, 2006
 Nirripirti skaphites Watts & Humphreys, 2003
 Nirripirti stegastos Watts & Humphreys, 2003
 Nirripirti tetrameres Watts & Humphreys, 2006
 Nirripirti verrucosus Watts & Humphreys, 2004
 Nirripirti wedgeensis Watts & Humphreys, 2003

References

Dytiscidae genera